The 1966 Arizona Wildcats baseball team represented the University of Arizona in the 1966 NCAA University Division baseball season. The Wildcats played their home games at UA Field. The team was coached by Frank Sancet in his 17th year at Arizona.

The Wildcats won the District VII Playoff to advanced to the College World Series, where they were defeated by the Southern California Trojans.

Roster

Schedule 

! style="" | Regular Season
|- valign="top" 

|- align="center" bgcolor="#ffcccc"
| 1 || February 25 ||  || UA Field • Tucson, Arizona || 5–6 || 0–1 || –
|- align="center" bgcolor="#ccffcc"
| 2 || February 26 || Cal Poly Pomona || UA Field • Tucson, Arizona || 10–5 || 1–1 || –
|- align="center" bgcolor="#ffcccc"
| 3 || February 26 || Cal Poly Pomona || UA Field • Tucson, Arizona || 0–5 || 1–2 || –
|-

|- align="center" bgcolor="#ccffcc"
| 4 || March 4 ||  || UA Field • Tucson, Arizona || 6–3 || 2–2 || –
|- align="center" bgcolor="#ccffcc"
| 5 || March 5 || UCLA || UA Field • Tucson, Arizona || 10–8 || 3–2 || –
|- align="center" bgcolor="#ffcccc"
| 6 || March 5 || UCLA || UA Field • Tucson, Arizona || 8–9 || 3–3 || –
|- align="center" bgcolor="#ccffcc"
| 7 || March 11 ||  || UA Field • Tucson, Arizona || 17–2 || 4–3 || –
|- align="center" bgcolor="#ccffcc"
| 8 || March 12 || Pepperdine || UA Field • Tucson, Arizona || 2–1 || 5–3 || –
|- align="center" bgcolor="#ccffcc"
| 9 || March 12 || Pepperdine || UA Field • Tucson, Arizona || 5–1 || 6–3 || –
|- align="center" bgcolor="#ffcccc"
| 10 || March 18 || at UCLA || Sawtelle Field • Los Angeles, California || 3–4 || 6–4 || –
|- align="center" bgcolor="#ccffcc"
| 11 || March 19 || at UCLA || Sawtelle Field • Los Angeles, California || 10–8 || 7–4 || –
|- align="center" bgcolor="#ffcccc"
| 12 || March 19 || at UCLA || Sawtelle Field • Los Angeles, California || 8–9 || 7–5 || –
|- align="center" bgcolor="#ccffcc"
| 13 || March 21 ||  || UA Field • Tucson, Arizona || 12–3 || 8–5 || –
|- align="center" bgcolor="#ccffcc"
| 14 || March 22 || Oregon State || UA Field • Tucson, Arizona || 9–3 || 9–5 || –
|- align="center" bgcolor="#ccffcc"
| 15 || March 23 || Oregon State || UA Field • Tucson, Arizona || 3–2 || 10–5 || –
|- align="center" bgcolor="#ccffcc"
| 16 || March 24 ||  || UA Field • Tucson, Arizona || 11–3 || 11–5 || –
|- align="center" bgcolor="#ccffcc"
| 17 || March 25 || Oregon || UA Field • Tucson, Arizona || 12–6 || 12–5 || –
|- align="center" bgcolor="#ccffcc"
| 18 || March 26 || Oregon || UA Field • Tucson, Arizona || 5–4 || 13–5 || –
|- align="center" bgcolor="#ccffcc"
| 19 || March 26 || Oregon || UA Field • Tucson, Arizona || 4–3 || 14–5 || –
|- align="center" bgcolor="#ffcccc"
| 20 || March 28 ||  || UA Field • Tucson, Arizona || 4–8 || 14–6 || –
|- align="center" bgcolor="#ccffcc"
| 21 || March 29 || Wyoming || UA Field • Tucson, Arizona || 10–3 || 15–6 || –
|- align="center" bgcolor="#ccffcc"
| 22 || March 30 || Wyoming || UA Field • Tucson, Arizona || 6–0 || 16–6 || –
|- align="center" bgcolor="#ccffcc"
| 23 || March 31 ||  || UA Field • Tucson, Arizona || 13–4 || 17–6 || –
|-

|- align="center" bgcolor="#ccffcc"
| 24 || April 1 || Michigan || UA Field • Tucson, Arizona || 9–0 || 18–6 || –
|- align="center" bgcolor="#ccffcc"
| 25 || April 2 || Michigan || UA Field • Tucson, Arizona || 14–4 || 19–6 || –
|- align="center" bgcolor="#ffcccc"
| 26 || April 2 || Michigan || UA Field • Tucson, Arizona || 5–6 || 19–7 || –
|- align="center" bgcolor="#ccffcc"
| 27 || April 4 ||  || UA Field • Tucson, Arizona || 7–2 || 20–7 || –
|- align="center" bgcolor="#ffcccc"
| 28 || April 5 || Iowa || UA Field • Tucson, Arizona || 5–6 || 20–8 || –
|- align="center" bgcolor="#ccffcc"
| 29 || April 6 || Iowa || UA Field • Tucson, Arizona || 6–1 || 21–8 || –
|- align="center" bgcolor="#ccffcc"
| 30 || April 7 || Iowa || UA Field • Tucson, Arizona || 6–4 || 22–8 || –
|- align="center" bgcolor="#ccffcc"
| 31 || April 9 || Iowa || UA Field • Tucson, Arizona || 8–4 || 23–8 || –
|- align="center" bgcolor="#ccffcc"
| 32 || April 9 || Iowa || UA Field • Tucson, Arizona || 18–4 || 24–8 || –
|- align="center" bgcolor="#ffcccc"
| 33 || April 15 || at  || Phoenix Municipal Stadium • Phoenix, Arizona || 3–7 || 24–9 || 0–1
|- align="center" bgcolor="#ccffcc"
| 34 || April 16 || at Arizona State || Phoenix Municipal Stadium • Phoenix, Arizona || 4–1 || 25–9 || 1–1
|- align="center" bgcolor="#ffcccc"
| 35 || April 16 || at Arizona State || Phoenix Municipal Stadium • Phoenix, Arizona || 5–13 || 25–10 || 1–2
|- align="center" bgcolor="#ccffcc"
| 36 || April 22 || at  || Lobo Field • Albuquerque, New Mexico || 6–5 || 26–10 || 2–2
|- align="center" bgcolor="#ccffcc"
| 37 || April 23 || at New Mexico || Lobo Field • Albuquerque, New Mexico || 10–4 || 27–10 || 3–2
|- align="center" bgcolor="#ffcccc"
| 38 || April 23 || at New Mexico || Lobo Field • Albuquerque, New Mexico || 3–4 || 27–11 || 3–3
|- align="center" bgcolor="#ffcccc"
| 39 || April 25 ||  || UA Field • Tucson, Arizona || 8–9 || 27–12 || 3–3
|- align="center" bgcolor="#ccffcc"
| 40 || April 26 || Sul Ross || UA Field • Tucson, Arizona || 11–3 || 28–12 || 3–3
|- align="center" bgcolor="#ccffcc"
| 41 || April 29 ||  || UA Field • Tucson, Arizona || 9–3 || 29–12 || 3–3
|- align="center" bgcolor="#ccffcc"
| 42 || April 30 || Northern Arizona || UA Field • Tucson, Arizona || 10–5 || 30–12 || 3–3
|-

|- align="center" bgcolor="#ccffcc"
| 43 || May 6 || New Mexico || UA Field • Tucson, Arizona || 13–3 || 31–12 || 4–3
|- align="center" bgcolor="#ccffcc"
| 44 || May 7 || New Mexico || UA Field • Tucson, Arizona || 18–2 || 32–12 || 5–3
|- align="center" bgcolor="#ccffcc"
| 45 || May 7 || New Mexico || UA Field • Tucson, Arizona || 18–1 || 33–12 || 6–3
|- align="center" bgcolor="#ccffcc"
| 46 || May 13 || Arizona State || UA Field • Tucson, Arizona || 1–0 || 34–12 || 7–3
|- align="center" bgcolor="#ffcccc"
| 47 || May 14 || Arizona State || UA Field • Tucson, Arizona || 4–5 || 34–13 || 7–4
|- align="center" bgcolor="#ccffcc"
| 48 || May 14 || Arizona State || UA Field • Tucson, Arizona || 7–6 || 35–13 || 8–4
|-

|-
|-
! style="" | Postseason
|- valign="top"

|- align="center" bgcolor="#ccffcc"
| 49 || May 28 || at Wyoming || Cowboy Field • Laramie, Wyoming || 10–2 || 36–13 || 8–4
|- align="center" bgcolor="#ccffcc"
| 50 || May 29 || at Wyoming || Cowboy Field • Laramie, Wyoming || 4–2 || 37–13 || 8–4
|-

|- align="center" bgcolor="#ccffcc"
| 51 || June 3 ||  || UA Field • Tucson, Arizona || 3–2 || 38–13 || 8–4
|- align="center" bgcolor="#ccffcc"
| 52 || June 4 || Idaho || UA Field • Tucson, Arizona || 8–5 || 39–13 || 8–4
|-

|- align="center" bgcolor="#ffcccc"
| 53 || June 13 || vs Texas || Johnny Rosenblatt Stadium • Omaha, Nebraska || 1–5 || 39–14 || 8–4
|- align="center" bgcolor="#ccffcc"
| 54 || June 14 || vs  || Johnny Rosenblatt Stadium • Omaha, Nebraska || 8–1 || 40–14 || 8–4
|- align="center" bgcolor="#ffcccc"
| 55 || June 15 || vs Southern California || Johnny Rosenblatt Stadium • Omaha, Nebraska || 4–8 || 40–15 || 8–4
|-

Awards and honors 
Ed Bayne
 All-WAC

Ken Kurtz
 All-WAC

Eddie Leon
 All-WAC
 First Team All-American American Baseball Coaches Association
 All-American The Sporting News

Pat O’Brien
 All-WAC
 Third Team All-American American Baseball Coaches Association
 All-American The Sporting News

Eddie Southard
 All-WAC

References 

Arizona Wildcats baseball seasons
Arizona Wildcats baseball
College World Series seasons
Arizona
Western Athletic Conference baseball champion seasons